Christopher Michael Carberry (born 27 April 1951) was a rugby union player who represented Australia.

Carberry, a hooker, was born in Sydney and claimed a total of 13 international rugby caps for Australia.

References

Published sources
 Howell, Max (2006) Born to Lead – Wallaby Test Captains (2005) Celebrity Books, New Zealand

Australian rugby union players
Australia international rugby union players
Living people
Rugby union hookers
1951 births
Rugby union players from New South Wales